The Math and Science Academy (MSA) is a charter school that serves students in grades 6 through 12. It is located in the City Center neighborhood of Woodbury, Minnesota, United States. MSA is a tuition free public school open to any student in the state of Minnesota.

Subject areas include mathematics, science, humanities, and foreign language. Students must pass complete programs in science and mathematics including biology, chemistry, physics, algebra, geometry, trigonometry, and calculus.  Graduates meet or exceed the Minnesota Graduation Standards in all areas.  Students may be moved into a different mathematics course level depending on performance.

Since its founding, MSA has encouraged its juniors and seniors to take advantage of Minnesota's Post Secondary Enrollment Option, in which high school students can take courses at a college or university in Minnesota, tuition paid by the state of Minnesota.  This option has been very popular among the upperclassmen.  While there are often very few upper-level course offerings due to lack of demand, most MSA students will have already earned anywhere from 1 to 4 semesters of college credit upon graduation.  More recently, MSA has also begun offering AP Calculus AB and BC, AP Computer Science Principles and A, Physics B, Chemistry and Biology.

Extracurricular activities 

 FIRST Robotics
 Science Bowl
 National Honor Society
 Theater
 Lego Robotics
 Basketball
 Volleyball
 Chess club
 Africa club
 Spanish club
 Earth Club
 Knitting Club
 Art Club
 Nordic ski
 Choir
 Orchestra
 Badminton (girls)
 Cross country
 Track and field
 Math club
 Book club
 Engineering
 Poetry
 Young adult literature
 Art & Tech
 Study Skills
 Dungeons & Dragons Club
 Trap Shooting

Rankings 
MSA was ranked as the #1 Public High School in Minnesota and #1 Public Middle School in Minnesota by Niche in 2022. MSA was also ranked #1 in Minnesota High Schools and #27 Charter High Schools nationally by U.S. News and World Report.

References

External links 
Math and Science Academy

Public high schools in Minnesota
Schools in Washington County, Minnesota
Public middle schools in Minnesota
Charter schools in Minnesota
1999 establishments in Minnesota
Educational institutions established in 1999